Arun Kumar may refer to:

 Arun Kumar (Bihar politician) (born 1959), former member of the Indian Parliament
 Arun Kumar Sah, Bihar politician and MLA
 Arun Kumar (Uttar Pradesh politician) (born 1948), Indian physician and member of Uttar Pradesh Legislative Assembly
 Arun Kumar (administrator) (born 1953), Indian civil servant
 Arun M. Kumar (born 1952), former chairman and CEO of KPMG in India
 Arun Kumar Aravind (born 1977), Indian film director, editor and producer
 Arun Vijay (born 1974), previously credited as Arun Kumar, an actor
 Uttam Kumar (1926–1980), birth name Arun Kumar Chatterjee
 Arun Kumar (bowls) (born 1961), Fijian international lawn bowler
 Stage name of Gururajulu Naidu

See also